Licorice Pizza is a 2021 American comedy-drama film written and directed by Paul Thomas Anderson. It stars Alana Haim and Cooper Hoffman in their film debuts, alongside an ensemble supporting cast including Sean Penn, Tom Waits, Bradley Cooper, and Benny Safdie. Set in 1973, the film follows the development of a young couple's relationship.

Licorice Pizza was released in the United States in select theaters on November 26, 2021, followed by a wide release on December 25. The film was a box-office bomb, grossing $33 million worldwide against a $40 million production budget. Despite this, it was acclaimed by critics and received three nominations at the 94th Academy Awards: Best Picture, Best Director, and Best Original Screenplay, making it Metro-Goldwyn-Mayer's first fully produced, marketed, and distributed film to be nominated for Best Picture since Rain Man in 1988. It also received three awards from the National Board of Review, including Best Film, was named one of the best films of 2021 by the American Film Institute, and received four nominations at the 79th Golden Globe Awards, including Best Motion Picture – Musical or Comedy.

Plot 
In 1973 San Fernando Valley, 15-year-old actor Gary Valentine meets Alana Kane, a 25-year-old photography assistant, at his school picture day. She is put off by his invitation to dinner that evening, but shows up anyway. When Gary's mother Anita cannot chaperone him on a press tour performance in New York City, he invites Alana to do it. Alana begins dating his co-star Lance, making Gary jealous, but they break up after Lance says he is an atheist during a Shabbat dinner with her Jewish family.

Gary begins selling waterbeds after coming across one at a wig shop and reconnects with Alana at a teenage trade expo. While at the expo, Gary is mistaken for a murder suspect and suddenly arrested, and Alana runs after him to the police station. He is soon released when the mix-up is sorted out. She joins his waterbed business, acting seductively on the phone to land a potential customer. After introducing Alana to his talent agent, Gary is upset that she is open to nudity but refuses to show him her breasts. Alana impulsively does so, but slaps him when he asks to touch them. They open a "Fat Bernie's" storefront for their waterbeds and Alana is hurt when Gary flirts with his classmate Sue, and later makes out with Sue in the back room. A jealous Alana peeks in on them before kissing a random man on the street and storming off.

Gary's agent secures Alana an audition for a film starring veteran actor Jack Holden, who brings her to the Tail o' the Cock restaurant, where Gary and his friends are also dining. An inebriated Alana makes Gary jealous and Holden’s friend, film director Rex Blau, convinces him to recreate one of his motorcycle stunts on a nearby golf course, bringing the entire restaurant along. Alana topples off the bike as Holden jumps over a flaming sand trap, and Gary runs to her side. Reconciled, they walk to the waterbed store, where Gary stops himself from touching a sleeping Alana's breast.

The 1973 oil crisis sweeps the country, forcing the waterbed manufacturer to close. Alana, Gary and his friends make one final delivery to the home of Jon Peters. Leaving to meet his girlfriend, Barbra Streisand, Peters humiliates Gary, threatening to strangle his brother if Gary damages the house. Setting up the waterbed, Gary intentionally leaves the hose running while filling the waterbed in the master bedroom, with Alana's approval. They drive away but are waved down by an agitated Peters, whose car has run out of gas. Driving him home to retrieve a gas canister, they take him to a crowded gas station but leave him behind after he violently commandeers a gas pump. Gary stops to smash Peters's car, but then they run out of gas as well. Alana maneuvers the truck backwards down a long hill to a gas station, impressing Gary but causing Alana to question her recent decisions.

Inspired by a campaign poster, Alana reaches out to her old classmate Brian, who brings her on as volunteer staffer for Joel Wachs, a city councilman running in the 1973 Los Angeles mayoral election. Gary briefly joins her but overhears that pinball will soon be legalized in the Valley and decides to open an arcade, leading to an argument with Alana. They lash out at each other about their difference in age and their fraught relationship. Alana tries to make peace, but Gary drives off.

Later, Gary prepares for the opening night of his arcade, remodeling his storefront into "Fat Bernie's Pinball Palace". That same night, Alana nearly shares a kiss with Brian but is invited to join Wachs at a restaurant. She arrives to meet Wachs and his partner Matthew, posing as Matthew's girlfriend to save Wachs from political embarrassment. Alana walks a deeply hurt Matthew home and they commiserate over the men in their lives. She goes to the arcade to find Gary, who has left to look for her at Wachs's office, with her sisters' encouragement. Alana and Gary eventually run into each other's arms and return to the arcade, where Gary pronounces she will be his wife. Sharing a kiss, they run into the night and Alana tells Gary that she loves him.

Cast 

Haim's sisters Danielle and Este, father Moti, and mother Donna also appear as Alana Kane's family. The children of Anderson and Rudolph, as well as the relatives and children of other filmmakers and cast members, also appear. Appearing as Gary's friends are Griff Giacchino as Mark, James Kelley as Tim, and Will Angarola as Kirk. John C. Reilly has an uncredited cameo as Fred Gwynne, the actor who portrayed Herman Munster (the credits list him as "Herman Munster as himself"), while Dan Chariton cameos as Sam Harpoon, a director.

Production

Development 

Around 2001, Anderson was walking by a middle school in Los Angeles on picture day. He observed one of the students nagging the female photographer and had an idea of the student having a romantic relationship with the photographer. The screenplay of Licorice Pizza evolved from this experience and additional stories told to Anderson by his friend Gary Goetzman, who was a child actor who had starred in the film Yours, Mine and Ours with Lucille Ball, appeared on The Ed Sullivan Show, and eventually started a waterbed company and pinball arcade. Goetzman at one time delivered a waterbed to Jon Peters's home. Anderson considered Fast Times at Ridgemont High and American Graffiti as major influences in the making of Licorice Pizza.

Anderson received permission from Jon Peters to develop a character based on him, on the sole condition that Peters's favorite pick-up line is used. Anderson went on to create a "monster version" of Peters based on 1970s Hollywood producers who had "a reputation for a lot of bravado and aggro energy."

In September 2021, the film was officially titled Licorice Pizza, named after a former chain of record shops in southern California. Anderson explained, "If there's two words that make me kind of have a Pavlovian response and memory of being a child and running around, it's 'licorice' and 'pizza' [...] It instantly takes me back to that time." He added that the words "seemed like a catch-all for the feeling of the film [...] that go well together and maybe capture a mood."

Casting 

Anderson wrote the screenplay with Alana Haim in mind and offered her the lead role in summer 2019. He has a close connection to her band Haim, having directed several of their music videos, and is a close friend of the Haim family. Haim's sisters Este and Danielle and parents Mordechai and Donna were also cast to play the roles of her family. Cooper Hoffman, the son of Philip Seymour Hoffman, was cast late in the process after Anderson found the auditioning young actors too "precocious" and "trained" to match the naturalistic style of Haim's acting. Licorice Pizza marks the feature film debut of both Haim and Hoffman. Described as a "family-and-friends project" by the Los Angeles Times, the film also features Anderson's longtime partner Maya Rudolph, their four children, and many of their neighborhood friends in various roles.

Filming 
Principal photography began in Encino, California, in August 2020, under the working title Soggy Bottom. In November 2020, it was reported that principal photography had wrapped and post-production had begun. A Tudor Revival manor previously owned by actor Lyle Waggoner was used for scenes at Jon Peters's house. Tail o' the Cock, a local restaurant that was demolished in 1987, was recreated for the film at the Van Nuys Golf Course. Haim spent a week learning to drive trucks, and performed her own stunt in which she backed a truck down a long hill.

Anderson and Michael Bauman (sharing a director of photography credit) shot Licorice Pizza on 35 mm film, using older lenses in order to create the film's 1970s texture.

Music 

Radiohead's Jonny Greenwood composed the film's score cues. The first trailer for the film, which was released online on September 27, 2021, was set to David Bowie's "Life on Mars?"

The official soundtrack was released by Republic Records. Included are some of the songs featured in the film, as well as one of the original tracks composed by Greenwood.The song " Stumblin' In" in movie, was actually recorded in 1978, which alters the 1973 time setting of film.

Release 
On December 18, 2019, Focus Features came on to produce and distribute the film. On July 17, 2020, it was reported that Metro-Goldwyn-Mayer acquired distribution rights to the film from Focus, and that MGM would set a new start date due to the COVID-19 pandemic.

The film was released in select theaters in the United States on November 26, 2021, by United Artists Releasing, and was followed by a nationwide release on December 25, 2021. It was released in the United Kingdom on January 14, 2022, by Universal Pictures.

Home media 
The film released digitally on March 1, 2022 and on Blu-ray and DVD on May 17, 2022 by Universal Pictures Home Entertainment.

Reception

Box office 
Licorice Pizza grossed $17.3 million in the United States and Canada, and $15.9 million in other territories, for a worldwide total of $33.2 million.

Licorice Pizza opened in four theaters on November 26, 2021, including the Regency Village Theatre in Los Angeles. It made $335,000 in its opening weekend, an average of $83,800 per screen. Audiences were reported to be 72% between the ages of 18 and 34, 66% male, and 70% Caucasian, 19% Latino and Hispanic, 8% Asian, and 3% Black. Close to 70% of all moviegoers were also college graduates. In its fifth weekend, the film expanded to 786 theaters and entered the box office top ten for the first time with $1.9 million, finishing eighth. During the weekend, 66% of audience members were between the ages of 18 and 34. The film made $1.3 million in its sixth weekend, $981,886 in its seventh, $879,511 in its eighth, $659,953 in its ninth, $630,117 in its tenth, and $644,699 in its eleventh. The film received an expansion after earning its three Academy Award nominations, and made $959,788 in its twelfth weekend, finishing eighth. It dropped out of the top ten in its thirteenth weekend with $647,973.

Critical response 
  Audiences polled by PostTrak gave the film an 87% positive score, with 73% saying they would definitely recommend it.

The film generated some controversy around the romance between the main characters, one of whom is 25 and the other 15. It also came under fire for scenes in which the character Jerry uses a demeaning mock Asian accent when speaking to his Japanese wives. Regarding the latter, director Anderson defended the scenes as being contemporaneous and accurate portrayals of the movie's time period. The group Media Action Network for Asian Americans, however, called for an awards boycott for the movie due to the decision to include these two scenes without any pushback from the characters.

Licorice Pizza was ranked second on Cahiers du Cinémas top 10 films of 2022 list.

Accolades

References

External links 
 

2021 comedy-drama films
2020s coming-of-age comedy-drama films
2020s English-language films
2020s high school films
American coming-of-age comedy-drama films
American high school films
Bron Studios films
Film productions suspended due to the COVID-19 pandemic
Films directed by Paul Thomas Anderson
Films impacted by the COVID-19 pandemic
Films scored by Jonny Greenwood
Films set in 1973
Films set in the San Fernando Valley
Films shot in Los Angeles
Films with screenplays by Paul Thomas Anderson
Focus Features films
Metro-Goldwyn-Mayer films
Universal Pictures films
2020s American films